Eva Sámano Bishop (May 5, 1910 – January 7, 1984) was a Mexican educator. She was the first wife of President Adolfo López Mateos and First Lady of Mexico from 1958 to 1964.

Biography
Eva Samano de López Mateos was born in Mexico in  San Nicolás del Oro, Guerrero on May 5, 1910. Early in her career, she taught at the Scientific and Literary Institute in Toluca. In 1937, she married future president Lopez Mateos. She served as First Lady of Mexico from 1958 until 1964. In 1961, she founded the National Institute for Infants, which The New York Times describes as "Mexico's first social assistance organization dedicated solely to children." The article also stated she "initiated the national movement to organize and improve medical and educational services for Mexican children." After her husband died in 1973, she returned to teaching.

Personal life and death
Upon her death in 1984, she was survived by a daughter.

See also

List of first ladies of Mexico 
Politics of Mexico

References

External links
1984 obituary

First ladies of Mexico
1910 births
1984 deaths
People from Guerrero
Mexican educators